Vadagupatti Maapillai is a 2001 Tamil-language romantic comedy film produced, co-written and directed by V. C. Guhanathan. The film stars Hamsavardhan and Reshma, while Vivek and Vadivelu appear in supporting roles. Featuring music composed by Sirpy, the film was released on 21 December 2001.

Plot
When Vadivu's city-based fiancé, Vijay, refuses to marry her for her simple looks, her father swears that he'll get them married anyhow. She then changes into the avatar of Jeena and enters Vijay's life.

Cast

Hamsavardhan as Vijay
Reshma as Vadivu (Jeena)
Anusha as Deepa
Vivek as Rowther
Vadivelu as Veerapandi
Senthil
Visu as Gomathi Shankar
Kovai Sarala as Anjala
Pandu as Dhadaji
Sumithra
Vaiyapuri
Seethalakshmi
Anuja

Production
The film was earlier titled as Anandham Anandham and production had started in mid-1998.

Soundtrack
Soundtrack was composed by Sirpy, while lyrics were written by Pazhani Bharathi.
"Yaru Intha Figure"
"Alwaa Kodukuran"
"Adi Maampazham Neraththazhaki"
"Sollamal Kaathal Azhaikirathe"

References

External links
 

2001 films
2000s Tamil-language films
2001 comedy-drama films
Indian comedy-drama films
Films directed by V. C. Guhanathan